The 1999–2000 Croatian Football Cup was the ninth edition of Croatia's football knockout competition. Osijek were the defending champions, and it was won by Hajduk Split.

Calendar

Preliminary round

First round

Second round

Quarter-finals

|}

Semi-finals

First legs

Second legs

Dinamo Zagreb won 6–1 on aggregate.

Hajduk Split won 4–3 on aggregate.

Final

First leg

Second leg

Hajduk Split won 2–1 on aggregate.

See also
1999–2000 Croatian First Football League
1999–2000 Croatian Second Football League

External links
Official website 
1999–2000 in Croatian football at Rec.Sport.Soccer Statistics Foundation

Croatian Football Cup seasons
1999–2000 domestic association football cups
Cup